The Persian Constitutional Revolution (or  Enghelāb-e Mashrūteh), also known as the Constitutional Revolution of Iran, took place between 1905 and 1911. The revolution led to the establishment of a parliament in Persia (Iran) during the Qajar dynasty.

The revolution opened the way for fundamental change in Persia, heralding the modern era. It was a period of unprecedented debate in a burgeoning press, and new economic opportunities. Many groups fought to shape the course of the revolution, and all segments of society were in some way changed by it. The old order, which King Nassereddin Shah Qajar had struggled for so long to sustain, was finally replaced by new institutions, new forms of expression, and a new social and political order.

King Mozaffar ad-Din Shah Qajar signed the 1906 constitution shortly before his death. He was succeeded by Mohammad Ali Shah, who abolished the constitution and bombarded the parliament in 1908 with Russian and British support. This led to another pro-constitutional movement. The constitutionalist forces marched to Tehran, forced Mohammad Ali Shah's abdication in favor of his young son Ahmad Shah Qajar, and re-established the constitution in 1909.

The 1921 Persian coup d'état refers to several major events which led to the establishment of the Pahlavi dynasty as Iran's ruling house in 1925. Iran's parliament amended the 1906–1907 constitution on December 12, 1925, replacing the 1797–1925 Qajar dynasty with the Pahlavi dynasty as the legitimate sovereigns of Iran. The revolution was followed by the Jungle Movement of Gilan (1914–1921).

History

With the first provision signed by Muzzafir al-Din days before his death, Iran saw legislative reform vital to their goal of independence from Britain and Russia. The three main groups of the coalition seeking a constitution were the bazaar merchants, the ulama, and a small group of radical reformers. They shared the goal of ending royal corruption and ending dominance by foreign powers. According to the revolutionaries, the role of the shah was being used to keep the Qajar dynasty and other aristocrats wealthy at the expense of Iran's resources and economy. They argued that whilst Iran's oil industry was sold to the British, tax breaks on imports, exports and manufactured textiles destroyed Iran's economy (which had been supported by the bazaar merchants).

Muzzafir al-Din accumulated a fortune in foreign debt while selling assets to pay interest, instead of investing in Iran. This sparked the revolt. The new fundamental law created a parliament, the Majles, and gave the legislature final approval of all loans and the budget. More power was divested from the shah with the supplementary fundamental law, which was passed by the National Assembly and signed by the new shah, Mohammad Ali, in October 1907. A committee of five mujtahids was to be created to ensure that new laws were compatible with the sharia. However, the committee never convened. Despite the ulamas efforts at independence from external dominance, Britain and Russia capitalized on Iran's weak government and signed the 1907 Anglo-Russian Convention dividing the country between them (with a neutral central zone). This constitutional period ended when the Majlis in Tehran's neutral zone dissolved over the issue of equal rights for non-Muslims; Russia then invaded and captured the city. Although Iran gained a constitution, Iranian independence was not achieved by the revolts.

Background

Weakness and extravagance continued during the brief reign of Mozaffar ad-Din Shah Qajar (1896–1907), who often relied on his chancellor to manage his decentralized state. His dire financial straits caused him to sign many concessions to foreign powers on trade items ranging from weapons to tobacco. The aristocracy, religious authorities, and educated elite began demanding a curb on royal authority and the establishment of the rule of law as their concern about foreign (especially Russian) influence grew. Qajar had taken large loans from Russia and Britain to pay for his extravagant lifestyle and the cost of the government; the shah financed a royal tour of Europe in 1900 by borrowing 22 million from Russia, using Iranian customs receipts as collateral.

First protests

In 1905, protests erupted about the imposition of Persian tariffs to repay the Russian loan for Mozaffar ad-Din Shah's royal tour. In December of that year, two merchants in Tehran were bastinadoed for price-gouging. The city's merchants rebelled, closing its bazaar. The clergy followed suit as a result of the alliance formed during the Tobacco Protest.

The two protesting groups sought sanctuary in a Tehran mosque, but the government entered the mosque and dispersed them. The dispersal triggered a larger movement which sought refuge at a shrine outside Tehran. The shah yielded to the demonstrators on January 12, 1906, agreeing to dismiss his prime minister and transfer power to a "house of justice" (forerunner of the Iranian parliament). The basti protesters returned from the shrine in triumph, riding royal carriages and hailed by a jubilant crowd.

During a fight in early 1906, government forces killed a sayyid (a descendant of Muhammad). In a skirmish shortly afterwards, Cossacks killed 22 protesters and injured 100. The bazaar again closed and the ulama went on strike, a large number taking sanctuary in the holy city of Qom. Many merchants went to the British embassy in Tehran, which agreed to shelter the basti on the grounds of the embassy.

Creation of the constitution

During the summer of 1906, about 12,000 men camped in the gardens of the British embassy in what has been called a "vast open-air school of political science". Demand for a parliament (majlis) began, with the goal of limiting the power of the shah. Mozaffar ad-Din Shah agreed on a parliament in August 1906, and the first elections were held that fall. One hundred fifty-six members were elected, the overwhelming majority from Tehran and the merchant class.

The National Consultative Assembly first met in October 1906. The shah was old and frail, and attending the inauguration of parliament was one of his last official acts. Mozaffar ad-Din Shah's son, Muhammad Ali, was unsympathetic to constitutionalism; the shah signed the constitution (modeled on the Belgian constitution) by December 31, 1906, making his power contingent on the will of the people, and died three days later.

Aftermath

Shah Muhammad Ali, the sixth Qajar shah, came to power in January 1907. The Anglo-Russian Convention, signed in August of that year, divided Iran into a Russian zone in the north and a British zone in the south; the center of the country was neutral. The British switched their support to the shah, abandoning the constitutionalists. In 1908, the shah moved to "exploit the divisions within the ranks of the reformers" and eliminate the majlis, creating a period in Iranian history called the Minor Tyranny. Persia tried to remain free of Russian influence through resistance (via the majlis) to the shah's policies.
Parliament appointed William Morgan Shuster Persia's treasurer-general. Russia issued an ultimatum to expel Shuster and suspend the parliament, occupying Tabriz.

Notable participants

Constitutionalists

Mirza Nasrullah Khan – First elected Prime Minister of Iran
Mirza Jahangir Khan – Founder and editor of the Sur-e Esrafil newspaper
Mirza Aqa Khan Kermani – Nationalist writer and literary critic
Mirza Sayyed Mohammad Tabatabai
Mohamad Vakil Altodjâr Yazdi – Deputy Rasht
Nikol Duman – Participated in the defense of Tabriz
Seyed Jamal Vaez
Hossein Ardabili – Active in Mashhad
Aref Ghazvini
Stepan Zorian
Ali-Akbar Dehkhoda
Mehdi Cont – Activist in Kerman
Sattar Khan – Revolutionary leader
Bagher Khan – Sālār-e Melli (national chieftain)
Mirza Kuchak Khan – Founder of a revolutionary movement based in the forests of Gilan Province
Mirza Malkom Khan
Khetcho – Armenian revolutionary leader
Yeprem Khan – Armenian Iranian revolutionary leader. Wounded Sattar Khan while disarming the revolutionaries in Tehran as commander of Tehran's police force during the interim constitutionalist government.
Arshak Gafavian – Armenian revolutionary leader
Sardar Assad – Bakhtiari tribal leader whose forces captured Tehran in 1909
Bibi Khanoom Astarabadi – Satirist, writer and pioneer of the Iranian women's movement
Hassan Pirnia
Heydar Latifiyan
Ahmad Kasravi
Amanollah Khan Zia' os-Soltan – Aristocrat and landowner who was accused of a bomb attack on Mohammad Ali Shah and freed by British troops
Mohammad-Taqi Bahar
Sevkaretsi Sako
Hassan Taqizadeh
Mirza Abdul'Rahim Talibov Tabrizi – Intellectual and social reformer.
Abdolhossein Teymourtash
Abdol-Hossein Farman Farma
Mohammad Vali Khan Tonekaboni – Leader of revolutionary forces from the northern provinces of Gilan and Mazandaran
Howard Baskerville – American teacher who fought with the constitutionalists and was killed
 Mohammed Mosaddeq – Liberal nationalist and future prime minister
Morteza Gholi Khan Hedayat

Monarchists
Abdol Majid Mirza
Sheikh Fazlollah Nouri – Cleric who was hanged after the revolution
Vladimir Liakhov – Russian colonel and commander of the Persian Cossack Brigade during the rule of Mohammad Ali Shah Qajar who shelled and besieged Parliament
Eskandar Khan Davidkhanian – Deputy Commander of the Cossack Brigade
Alexander Khan Setkhanian – Second in command to Vladimir Liakhov

Religious leaders
Mohammad-Kazem Khorasani, constitutionalist
Sayyed Jamal ad-Din Esfahani, constitutionalist
Sayyed Abdullah Behbahani, constitutionalist 
Mirza Sayyed Mohammad Tabatabai, constitutionalist
Mirza Hussein Naini, constitutionalist
Mohammed Kazem Yazdi, anti-constitutionalist
Sheikh Fazlollah Nuri, anti-constitutionalist
Mirza Abutaleb Zanjani, anti-constitutionalist

Usuli vs Islamist debate 
The fourth Qajar King, Naser al-Din Shah was assassinated by Mirza Reza Kermani, a follower of Jamāl al-Dīn al-Afghānī, when he was visiting and praying in the Shah Abdul-Azim Shrine on 1 May 1896. At Mozaffar al-Din Shah's accession Persia faced a financial crisis, with annual governmental expenditures far in excess of revenues as a result of the policies of his father.  King Mozaffar ad-Din Shah signed the 1906 constitution shortly before his death. The members of newly formed parliament stayed constantly in touch with Akhund Khurasani and whenever legislative bills were discussed, he was telegraphed the details for a juristic opinion. In a letter dated June 3, 1907, the parliament told Akhund about a group of anti-constitutionalists who were trying to undermine legitimacy of democracy in the name of religious law. The trio replied:

At the dawn of the democratic movement, Sheikh Fadlullah Nouri, supported the sources of emulation in Najaf in their stance on constitutionalism and the  belief that people must counter the autocratic regime in the best way, that is constitution of legislature and limiting the powers of the state; hence, once constitutional movement began, he made speeches and distributed tracts to insist on this important thing. However, when the new Shah, Muhammad Ali Shah Qajar, decided to roll back democracy and establish his authority by military and foreign support, Shaikh Fazlullah sided with the King's court.

Meanwhile, the new Shah had understood that he could not roll back the constitutional democracy by royalist ideology, and therefore he decided to use religion. Nouri was a rich and high-ranking Qajar court official responsible for conducting marriages and contracts. He also handled wills of wealthy men and collected religious funds. Nouri was opposed to the very foundations of the institution of parliament. He led a large group of followers and began a round-the-clock sit-in in the Shah Abdol-Azim Shrine on June 21, 1907 which lasted till September 16, 1907. He generalized the idea of religion as a complete code of life. He believed democracy would allow for “teaching of chemistry, physics and foreign languages”, and that this would cause the spread of atheism. He bought a printing press and launched a newspaper of his own, “Ruznamih-i-Shaikh Fazlullah”, and published leaflets. He believed that the ruler was accountable to no institution other than God and people have no right to limit the powers or question the conduct of the king. He declared that those who supported democratic form of government were faithless and corrupt, and apostates. He hated the idea of female education and said that girls' schools were brothels. He also opposed allocation of funds for modern industry, modern ways of governance, equal rights for all citizens irrespective of their religion and freedom of the press. He believed that people were cattle, but paradoxically, he wanted to “awaken the Muslim brethren”.

The anti-democracy clerics incited violence and one such cleric said that getting in the proximity of the parliament was a bigger sin than adultery, robbery and murder. In Zanjan, Mulla Qurban Ali Zanjani mobilized a force of six hundred thugs who looted shops of pro-democracy merchants, took hold of the city for several days, and killed the representative Sa'd al-Saltanih. Nouri himself recruited mercenaries from criminal gangs to harass supporters of democracy. On December 22, 1907, Nouri led a mob towards Tupkhanih Square and attacked merchants and looted stores. Nouri's ties to the court of monarchy and landlords reinforced his fanaticism. He even contacted the Russian embassy for support and his men delivered sermons against democracy in mosques, resulting in chaos. Akhund Khurasani was consulted on the matter and in a letter dated December 30, 1907, the three Marja's said:

However, Nouri continued his activities and a few weeks later Akhund Khurasani and his fellow Marja's argued for his expulsion from Tehran:

Mirza Ali Aqa Tabrizi, the enlightened Thiqa tul-islam from Tabriz, opposed Nuri saying that only the opinion of the sources of emulation is worthy of consideration in the matters of faith. He wrote:

And
{{blockquote|Let us consider the idea that the constitution is against Sharia law: all oppositions of this kind are in vain because the hujjaj al-islam of the atabat, who are today the models (marja) and the refuge (malija) of all Shiites, have issued clear fatwas that uphold the necessity of the Constitution. Aside from their words, they have also shown this by their actions. They see in Constitution the support for splendour of Islam.}}
He firmly opposed the idea of a supervisory committee of Tehran's clerics censoring the conduct of the parliament,  and said that:

As far as Nouri's argument was concerned, Akhund Khurasani refuted it in a light tone by saying that he supported the “parliament at Baharistan Square”, questioning the legitimacy of Nouri's assembly at Shah Abdul Azim shrine and their right to decide for the people. 
Responding to a question about Nouri's arguments, Akhund Muhammad Kazim Khurasani said:

As “sanctioned by sacred law and religion”, Akhund believes, a theocratic government can only be formed by the infallible Imam.  
Nouri interpreted Sharia in a self-serving and shallow way, unlike Akhund Khurasani who, as a well received source of emulation, viewed the adherence to religion in a society beyond one person or one interpretation. While Nouri confused Sharia with written constitution of a modern society, Akhund Khurasani understood the difference and the function of the two.
Nouri tried to get support from Ayatullah Kazim Yazdi, another prominent Marja of Najaf. He was apolitical, and therefore during the Iranian Constitutional Revolution, he stayed neutral most of the times and seldom issued any political statement. Contrary to Akhund Khorasani, he thought that Usulism did not offer the liberty to support constitutional politics. In his view, politics was beyond his expertise and therefore he avoided taking part in it.  While Akhund Khorasani was an eminent Marja' in Najaf, many imitators prayed behind Kazim Yazdi too, as his lesson on rulings (figh) was famous. In other words both Mohammad Kazem and Khorasani had constituted a great Shia school in Najaf although they had different views in politics at the same time. However, he was not fully supportive of Fazlullah Nouri and Muhammad Ali Shah, therefore, when parliament asked him to review the final draft of constitution, he suggested some changes and signed the document. He said that modern industries were permissible unless explicitly prohibited by Sharia. He also agreed with teaching of modern sciences, and added that the state should not intervene the centers of religious learning (Hawza). He wasn't against formation of organizations and societies that do not create chaos, and in this regard there was no difference between religious and non-religious organizations. In law-making, unlike Nouri, he separated the religious (Sharia) and public law (Urfiya). His opinion was that the personal and family matters should be settled in religious courts by jurists, and the governmental affaris and matters of state should be taken care of by modern judiciary. Parliament added article 71 and 72 into the constitution based on his opinions. Ayatullah Yazdi said that as long as modern constitution did not force people to do what was forbidden by Sharia and refrain from religious duties, there was no reason to oppose democratic rule and the government had the right to prosecute wrong doers.
The Revolutional Tribunal declared Nouri guilty of inciting mobs against the constitutionalists and issuing fatwas declaring parliamentary leaders "apostates", "atheists," "secret Freemasons" and koffar al-harbi (warlike pagans) whose blood ought to be shed by the faithful.Abrahamian, Ervand, Tortured Confessions by Ervand Abrahamian, University of California Press, 1999 p. 24

Execution

Nouri allied himself with the new Shah, Mohammad Ali Shah, who, with the assistance of Russian troops staged a coup against the Majlis (parliament) in 1907. In 1909, however, constitutionalists marched onto Tehran. Nouri was arrested, tried and found guilty of "sowing corruption and sedition on earth," and in July 1909, Nouri was hanged as a traitor.

See also

Young Turk Revolution
History of Iran
History of the Iranian Constitutional Revolution by Ahmad Kasravi
Intellectual movements in Iran
Muhammad Kazim Khurasani
Mirza Husayn Tehrani
Abdallah Mazandarani
Mirza Ali Aqa Tabrizi
Mirza Sayyed Mohammad Tabatabai
Seyyed Abdollah Behbahani
Ruhollah Khomeini
Islamic fundamentalism in Iran
Iranian Revolution of 1979
Tobacco Protest
List of modern conflicts in the Middle East
Triumph of Tehran
Secularism in Iran
Ibn al-Sheikh
Women in Constitutional Revolution
 Bourgeois revolution

References

Sources

Ahmad Kasravi, Tārikh-e Mashruteh-ye Iran (تاریخ مشروطهٔ ایران) (History of the Iranian Constitutional Revolution)  951 p. (Negāh Publications, Tehran, 2003), . Note: This book is also available in two volumes, published by Amir Kabir Publications in 1984. Amir Kabir's 1961 edition is in one 934-page volume.
Ahmad Kasravi, History of the Iranian Constitutional Revolution: Tarikh-e Mashrute-ye Iran, Volume I, translated into English by Evan Siegel, 347 p. (Mazda Publications, Costa Mesa, California, 2006). 
Mehdi Malekzādeh, Tārikh-e Enqelāb-e Mashrutyyat-e Iran (تاريخ انقلاب مشروطيت ايران) (The History of the Constitutional Revolution of Iran) in 7 volumes, published in 3 volumes (1697 pp.) (Sokhan Publications, Tehran, 2004, 1383 AH). 

Further reading
 

Browne, Edward G., The Persian Constitutional Movement. British Academy, 1918.
Browne, Edward G., "The Persian Revolution of 1905-1909", Mage Publishers (July 1995). 
Afary, Janet, "The Iranian Constitutional Revolution, 1906-1911", Columbia University Press. 1996. 
Foran, John. "The Strengths and Weaknesses of Iran’s Populist Alliance: A Class Analysis of the Constitutional Revolution of 1905 - 1911", Theory and Society, Vol. 20, No. 6 (Dec 1991), pp. 795–823. JSTOR

 Ahmad Kasravi, Tārikh-e Mashruteh-ye Iran (تاریخ مشروطهٔ ایران) (History of the Iranian Constitutional Revolution), in Persian, 951 p. (Negāh Publications, Tehran, 2003), . Note:''' This book is also available in two volumes, published by Amir Kabir Publications in 1984. Amir Kabir's 1961 edition is in one volume, 934 pages.
 Ahmad Kasravi, History of the Iranian Constitutional Revolution: Tārikh-e Mashrute-ye Iran, Volume I, translated into English by Evan Siegel, 347 p. (Mazda Publications, Costa Mesa, California, 2006). 

External links

Reza Jamāli in conversation with Dr Abbās Amānat, Professor of History and International and Area Studies at University of Yale, in Persian, Radio Zamaneh, August 7, 2008 (Audio recording).
Shokā Sahrāi, Photographs of the Constitutional Revolution of Iran, in Persian, Jadid Online, 2007.Slide Show, narrated by Dr Bāqer Āqeli'', Jadid Online, 2007: (4 min 30 sec).
Constitutional Revolution of Iran

19th-century Iranian politicians
Iranian Islamists
Iranian Shia clerics
People of the Persian Constitutional Revolution
People executed by Iran by hanging
Executed Iranian people
People from Nur, Iran
20th-century Iranian politicians
 
Revolutions in Iran
Iranian democracy movements
20th-century revolutions
1900s conflicts
1910s conflicts
Conflicts in 1905
Conflicts in 1906
Conflicts in 1907
Conflicts in 1908
Conflicts in 1909
Conflicts in 1910
Conflicts in 1911
1900s in Iran
1910s in Iran
1905 in Iran
1906 in Iran
1907 in Iran
1908 in Iran
1909 in Iran
1910 in Iran
1911 in Iran
Politics of Qajar Iran
History of civil rights and liberties in Iran
Iran–Russia military relations
Wars involving Russia
Armenian Revolutionary Federation